Isaiah Bradley is one of the superheroes to hold the title of Captain America, appearing in American comic books published by Marvel Comics. The character is an early product of the United States' Super Soldier program (codenamed Project: Rebirth) during World War II.

Carl Lumbly portrays the character in the Marvel Cinematic Universe streaming television series The Falcon and the Winter Soldier (2021), and will reprise the role in the upcoming film Captain America: New World Order (2024).

Publication history
The original concept for the character came from an offhand comment by Marvel Comics' publisher Bill Jemas. Editor Axel Alonso was taken by the idea "inherent of politics of wrapping a Black man in red, white, and blue" and "a larger story ... a metaphor of America itself"; he also immediately thought of the Tuskegee Study. He proceeded to pitch the idea to Robert Morales, who was brought in to write the story, created the supporting cast and the ending. The idea of an African American Captain America made Morales laugh, but, once he heard the premise, he found it depressing. Morales originally envisioned the character as a scientist who experimented on himself, a reference to Silver Age scientist Bruce Banner; however, Marvel wanted a more explicit reference to the Tuskegee Syphilis Study. Morales was able to push through an ending in which Bradley suffered brain damage, a reference to Muhammad Ali that gave the character a tragic ending. Morales performed extensive research into the time period, which he balanced with editorial suggestions.

As depicted in the 2003 limited series Truth: Red, White & Black, the World War II Super Soldier program of 1942, operated by Reinstein (Dr. Wilfred Nagel, employing an alias previously used by Dr. Abraham Erskine), uses African American test subjects to re-create the Super Soldier Serum that had previously been used to turn Steve Rogers from a skinny, but patriotic, army reject into Captain America. The clandestine experimentation that empowers Isaiah is reminiscent of the Tuskegee Syphilis Study.

Fictional character biography
Project: Rebirth begins as a collaboration between US, British and German scientists led by Dr. "Josef Reinstein" (real name Dr. Wilfred Nagel), and Dr. Koch. When World War II begins, Koch takes over the German program and Reinstein takes over the American program. Each attempts to recreate the super soldier serum which had previously turned Steve Rogers into Captain America a year prior to Pearl Harbor. Reinstein's early attempts to refine the formula are tested on African-Americans. Three hundred of these soldiers are taken from Camp Cathcart and subjected to potentially fatal experiments at an undisclosed location, as seen in Truth: Red, White & Black. Only five subjects survive the original trials. In the name of secrecy, US soldiers execute the camp's commander and hundreds of black soldiers left behind at Camp Cathcart. The government tells the families of the three hundred subjects that their loved ones had died in battle.

Due to field missions in Europe and internal strife, Bradley emerges the sole survivor of his test group. He steals a spare costume and a shield intended for Captain America before he engages in a suicide mission to destroy the Super Soldier efforts of the Nazis at the Schwarzebitte concentration camp. There, he is able to assassinate Koch, but the mission ends when the Germans capture Bradley. Nazi interest in the American supersoldier is high; he is even brought before the Führer himself who decides to dissect him in order to reverse engineer his powers and send the spare parts back to America as a message. Bradley is later rescued by German insurgents, only to be court-martialed and imprisoned at Leavenworth around 1943. In 1960, Bradley is pardoned by President Eisenhower and released.

Considered to be the "Black Captain America", Isaiah Bradley is depicted as an underground legend among much of the African-American community in the Marvel Universe. A number of the most noted Africans and African-Americans of the twentieth century's last four decades visit Bradley as a sign of respect and, in many cases, hero worship. He receives visits from Malcolm X, Richard Pryor, Muhammad Ali, Angela Davis, Alex Haley, Nelson Mandela, and Colin Powell. Outside the Black community, he remains largely unknown. When he arrives as a special guest at the wedding of Storm and Black Panther, several African-American heroes are awestruck, including Luke Cage (who describes him as "the first me"), Goliath, Monica Rambeau, Triathlon, and Falcon. Canadian-born Wolverine is totally unaware of the man's identity or importance.

Josiah X
At the time when Isaiah was in prison for operating as Captain America, the government attempts to use his altered DNA to create another Super Soldier. After 39 attempts the result is a child named Josiah, Isaiah and Faith's genetic son. Josiah X, as he would later call himself, is born to a surrogate mother who smuggles him out of the government's clutches. The character was introduced in the short-lived comic book series The Crew, created by Christopher Priest and Joe Bennett and published in 2003.

Encountering Steve Rogers
Meanwhile, the long-term effects of the test serum severely damage Bradley's mind and body, similar in part to the effects of various steroids and Alzheimer's. In 2003, Steve Rogers learns the truth behind the Super Soldier program and attempts a reconciliation with the now-childlike Bradley. Captain America never discovers that the true mastermind behind the Super Soldier program is the clandestine organization Weapon Plus, and that Bradley is only one in a long line of Weapons, including Wolverine and Fantomex.

Patriot
Isaiah is also the grandfather of Elijah Bradley (aka Patriot of the Young Avengers). Elijah initially claims that his powers originated from a blood transfusion from Isaiah, whereby he gained the abilities of the super soldier serum. However, it is subsequently revealed that this is a lie, and Elijah really gains his powers artificially from the drug Mutant Growth Hormone. The Young Avengers convince him that he does not need superpowers to be a superhero and he becomes the head of the Young Avengers using his intelligence and natural athletic abilities. After Eli is critically injured in a battle with the Kree and Skrulls, he gets a blood transfusion from his grandfather which enables him to have his grandfather's abilities.

Powers and abilities
While Isaiah possesses no superhuman powers as such, the super soldier formula running through his veins means that, physically, he is the perfect human: all of his bodily functions have been enhanced to the peak of human efficiency, making his agility, dexterity, strength, speed, endurance, reaction time, coordination, and balance superior to those of an Olympic athlete. His body eliminates any excessive build-up of lactic acid and other fatigue poisons in his muscles, which grants him phenomenal endurance. He has an extraordinary immunity to disease, and his aging process is also slowed dramatically. Isaiah is trained in unarmed combat by the U.S. Army.

Equipment
Isaiah carries a concave triangular metal shield, useful for either defense or offense, which he decorated with the Double V campaign eagle crest, a symbol of a victory against the Axis as well as a victory against racial discrimination at home. For protection, he wears a loose chain mesh shirt over light padding; the shirt is capable of blunting the impact of most small arms fire.

Other versions
 In Captain America vol. 4 #28, the character of an alternate Earth is Captain America and never marries. Later, he is elected President of the United States and serves two terms. He travels back in time, incidentally crossing to Earth-616, and brings the mainstream Captain America and Rebecca Quan forward into his own time to prevent his daughter Rebecca "Becky" Barnes from traveling to Earth-616.
 The Ultimate Marvel version Nick Fury shares many similarities with Isaiah Bradley: being unwillingly inducted into a United States government experiment during World War II to recreate the Super Soldier Serum as the only subject to survive an experiment with a healing factor, enhanced physical attributes and slowed or halted aging. However, a 1980s-set flashback with Jefferson Davis and Aaron Davis has Turk Barrett mentioning "Izzy" had just been "telling us what really happened to Captain America back in World War II."; Izzy is either the actual character or one of several girls in the room.
 In the Spider-Gwen reality, Isaiah Bradley was mentioned to be a US Army Private who was one of the four candidates (alongside Bucky Barnes, Steve Rogers and Samantha Wilson) for the Strategic Scientific Reserve's Project Rebirth. Isaiah was heavily injured alongside Rogers and Barnes during the operation's sabotage caused by Nazi double-agents to which Wilson is ultimately Captain America.

Captain America timeline
Clarifying the timeline for Isaiah Bradley and Steve Rogers—and who predates whom—Robert Morales states in his appendix to the Truth: Red, White & Black trade paperback collection (2004):

Truth co-creator Kyle Baker further clarified the respective timelines of Bradley and Rogers in an interview:

Reaction and analysis
Editor-in-chief Axel Alonso felt that critical reaction of some fans to the first image that Marvel released of the silhouette of an African American man in a Captain America costume was based on the prejudicial assumption that it tarnished Captain America's legacy. Alonso stated that by the time the entire series had been published, reaction was more positive, with one prominent reviewer writing that he had done precisely this.

Sharon Packer, in her 2010 book Superheroes and Superegos: Analyzing the Minds Behind the Masks, the events and characters of Truth convey important messages about decoded as commentary on race relations, conspiracy theories, and performance enhancement in sports.

In other media
Isaiah Bradley appears in the live-action Marvel Cinematic Universe television miniseries The Falcon and the Winter Soldier, portrayed by Carl Lumbly. Introduced in the episode "The Star-Spangled Man", this version is an aging, veteran super soldier who was active in the Korean War and defeated the Winter Soldier, but was imprisoned for 30 years after his service and experimented on by the government and HYDRA. All the while, his existence was kept secret. In the present, Isaiah lives in Baltimore with his grandson Eli Bradley. In the episode "Power Broker", it is revealed that his blood was used by HYDRA scientist Dr. Wilfred Nagel to recreate the Super Soldier Serum while working for the CIA. In the episode "Truth", Sam Wilson revisits Isaiah with Captain America's shield, but the latter rejects it, expressing doubt that the government would ever allow a black man as Captain America. In the series finale "One World, One People", Wilson takes Isaiah to the Smithsonian's Captain America exhibit, where a statue of the latter has been installed to commemorate his actions.

Collected editions
Stories he has appeared in have been collected into graphic novels:
 Truth: Red, White & Black (collects Truth: Red, White & Black #1-7, by Robert Morales and Kyle Baker); published in 2004. Reprinted in 2009 as Captain America: Truth. A new trade paperback edition was released in 2022, retaining the Captain America: Truth title. 
 Captain America: Homeland (collects Captain America vol. 4 #21-28, by Robert Morales, Chris Bachalo and Eddie Campbell); published in 2004.

References

External links
 
 
 
 

African-American superheroes
Incarnations of Captain America
Fictional United States Army personnel
Marvel Comics martial artists
Marvel Comics military personnel
Marvel Comics mutates
Marvel Comics superheroes
United States-themed superheroes
Fictional shield fighters
Fictional super soldiers
Fictional World War II veterans
Comics characters introduced in 2003